Dasania is a genus in the phylum Pseudomonadota (Bacteria).

Etymology
The name Dasania derives from:New Latin feminine gender noun Dasania, named in honour of Dasan, a Korean scientist in 18th and 19th century and after the name of Korean Arctic research station, Dasan Station, in Ny-Ålesund.

Species
The genus contains a single species, namely D. marina ( Lee et al. 2008, Latin feminine gender adjective marina, of the sea, marine, referring to the environment where the type strain was isolated.)

See also
 Bacterial taxonomy
 Microbiology

References 

Bacteria genera
Monotypic bacteria genera
Pseudomonadales